The 1908 Missouri gubernatorial election was held on November 3, 1908 and resulted in a victory for the Republican nominee, Missouri Attorney General Herbert S. Hadley, over the Democratic candidate, former Congressman William S. Cowherd, and several other candidates representing minor parties.

This election broke a string of eleven consecutive Democratic governors, as it was the first election since 1870 which did not result in a victory by the Democratic nominee (no Democrat had run in 1870).

Results

References

Missouri
1908
Gubernatorial
November 1908 events